Samobor is a village in the municipality of Gacko, Republika Srpska, Bosnia and Herzegovina. It is known for its distinctive bacon.

References

Villages in Republika Srpska
Populated places in Gacko